Roland Rust is an American business professor, author and consultant.

Professional background and accomplishments
Rust is Distinguished University Professor and holds the David Bruce Smith Chair in Marketing at the Smith School of Business, University of Maryland, College Park, the first business professor to be named a Distinguished University Professor at Maryland.  He is one of two people named a Fellow of the American Marketing Association and the European Marketing Academy.

He founded the annual Frontiers in Service Conference as well as the Journal of Service Research. He is Executive Director of the Center for Excellence in Service and the Center for Complexity in Business. He holds a visiting position at Erasmus University and is an International Research Fellow at Oxford University.  His lifetime achievement honors include the AMA Irwin McGraw-Hill Distinguished Marketing Educator Award, inaugural Fellow of the AMA, INFORMS Society for Marketing Science Fellow, the Converse Award, the Distinguished Marketing Educator Award from the Academy of Marketing Science.

His articles and books span the fields of marketing, service management, advertising, psychology, sociology, computer science, information systems, engineering, operations research, and management.  He is a former Editor of the Journal of Marketing and the Journal of Service Research and is currently Editor of the International Journal of Research in Marketing (IJRM).  He has a global consulting practice, and comments on service issues on television, radio, and in the press.

Education and positions held
Rust earned a BA in Mathematics (Phi Beta Kappa) at DePauw University, and an MBA and Ph.D. in Business Administration at the University of North Carolina, Chapel Hill. He served on the faculty of the University of Texas at Austin and Vanderbilt University before coming to Maryland.

References

 "A Baker's Dozen of Experts," Fast Company, https://web.archive.org/web/20150103065623/http://www.fastcompany.com/resources/customer/experts.html. Retrieved 2015-1-21.
 "Faculty Profile: Dr. Roland Rust," http://www.rhsmith.umd.edu/directory/roland-rust. Retrieved 2015-1-21.
 "Distinguished University Professors," http://faculty.umd.edu/awards/list_dup.html. Retrieved 2015-1-21.
 "AMA Announces Inaugural AMA Fellows," https://www.ama.org/AboutAMA/Pages/Inaugural-AMA-Fellows.aspx. Retrieved 2015-8-28.
 European Marketing Academy, http://www.emac-online.org/r/default.asp?iId=GFFFGG. Retrieved 2015-8-28.
 "Frontiers in Service Conference," http://www.rhsmith.umd.edu/centers-excellence/center-excellence-service/news-events/frontiers-service-conference. Retrieved 2015-1-21.
 "R.T. (Roland) Rust, Visiting Staff," http://www.erim.eur.nl/people/roland-rust/. Retrieved 2015-1-21.
 "Roland Rust, International Research Fellow," Oxford University Centre for Corporate Reputation, http://www.sbs.ox.ac.uk/community/people/roland-rust. Retrieved 2015-1-21.
 "AMA Irwin/McGraw-Hill Distinguished Marketing Educator Award," http://www.marketingpower.com/Community/ARC/Pages/Career/Awards/Irwin-McGraw-Hill/default.aspx. Retrieved 2015-1-21.
 "Fellow Award," INFORMS, https://www.informs.org/Recognize-Excellence/Community-Prizes-and-Awards/Marketing-Science-Society/Fellow-Award. Retrieved 2015-1-21.
 "Paul D. Converse Award Winners," http://business.illinois.edu/ba/FSDB/news_article.aspx?ID=1425. Retrieved 2015-1-21.
 "2007 AMS Annual Conference," www.ams-web.org/associations/213/files/07FinalProgram.doc. Retrieved 2015-1-21.
 http://www.rhsmith.umd.edu/marketing/faculty/pdfs/faculty_cv/rust.pdf. Retrieved 2015-1-21.
	"Journal of Marketing Previous Editors," http://www.marketingpower.com/AboutAMA/Pages/AMA%20Publications/AMA%20Journals/Journal%20of%20Marketing/JournalofMarketingPreviousEditors.aspx. Retrieved 2015-1-21.

American businesspeople
DePauw University alumni
Fellows of the American Marketing Association
Marketing people
Living people
University of Maryland, College Park faculty
UNC Kenan–Flagler Business School alumni
University of Texas at Austin faculty
Vanderbilt University faculty
Fellows of the American Statistical Association
Year of birth missing (living people)
Journal of Marketing editors